Prima Games is a publishing company of video game strategy guides in the United States. Formerly, Prima was an imprint of Dorling Kindersley, a division of Penguin Random House, and produced print strategy guides, featuring in-depth walkthroughs for completing games and other information, such as character sheets and move charts. Prima was acquired by Asteri Holdings in March 2019, which will transition the business to provide strategy guides in online form only, alongside other gaming news.

The company was acquired by GAMURS Group in January 2022.

History 
Prima Publishing was a small publisher working out of a residential-style home office in Roseville, California when in 1990 its owner, Ben Dominitz, contracted with author Rusel DeMaria to create a video game strategy guide imprint, initially called "The Secrets of the Games". At the time, DeMaria was senior editor for PC Games magazine and on the staff of GamePro. The initial contract called for five books – the first ones being Nintendo Games Secrets, Sega Genesis Games Secrets, Turbografx Games Secrets, Game Boy Games Secrets and The Official Lucasfilm Games Air Combat Strategies Book.

Notable titles included Myst: The Official Strategy Guide, which sold in excess of 1.25 million copies in all versions, The 7th Guest: The Official Strategy Guide, X-Wing: The Official Strategy Guide, TIE Fighter: The Official Strategy Guide, Secret of Mana Game Secrets, Prince of Persia: The Official Strategy Guide, a special Sonic the Hedgehog book for Sega and two Earthworm Jim strategy guides. DeMaria served as the principal author and creative director of Secrets of the Games between 1990 and 1996. He also was the editor on several books by other authors.

In 2005, Prima introduced electronic distribution of gaming guides.

In 2006, Prima Games undertook an effort to revolutionize the quality of MMORPG strategy guides. Historically those had largely consisted of charts of data, maps and basic instructions. What they were lacking was expert strategy content. Prima engaged the online gaming community known as The Syndicate (www.LLTS.org) who was very large, well known and well connected with developers. That partnership resulted in a shift in how strategy guides were written. They began to be less of a data dump and more of a deep strategy. Examples of this can be seen in the LOTRO, Pirates of the Burning Seas, Vanguard, Warhammer Online and other similar guides from 2006 through 2009.

Prima entered a partnership with Nintendo in 2007, creating several official game guides over the years (such as for Super Mario Galaxy, Super Mario Galaxy 2, and Super Mario Odyssey.). They contained gameplay tips, walkthroughs, and canon lore. Some of these even featured never-before-seen concept art.

In 2009, Prima Games decided to take the expert strategy concept an additional step. First, they hired The Syndicate (its own independent studio) in place of a specific author. The guides would be written from the ground up solely by The Syndicate. They filled the role of writer, author, project management and editor. Second, the scope of the guides they worked on was expanded from just MMOs to include FPS, RTS and RPG games.

In 2010, Prima started selling their strategy guides on Steam.

In 2013, Prima parent company Random House merged with Penguin Group, owner of competing strategy guide imprint BradyGames, to form Penguin Random House. On June 1, 2015, it was announced that the two imprints would merge, and continue to operate solely under the Prima Games brand.

Prima has also worked with developers directly to create guides like Half-Life 2: Raising the Bar.

Penguin Random House announced in November 2018 that it has decided to close Prima Games by Q2 2019. However, by March 14, 2019, the division was acquired by Asteri Holdings, which will shutter the print operations and instead have Prima provide game strategy guides in online form as well as expanding into gaming news.

The company was acquired by GAMURS Group in January 2022.

References

External links 

American companies established in 1990
Publishing companies established in 1990
Companies based in Shreveport, Louisiana
Book publishing companies based in Louisiana
Video game journalism
1990 establishments in Louisiana
2019 mergers and acquisitions
2022 mergers and acquisitions